A total solar eclipse occurred on February 4–5, 1943. A solar eclipse occurs when the Moon passes between Earth and the Sun, thereby totally or partly obscuring the image of the Sun for a viewer on Earth. A total solar eclipse occurs when the Moon's apparent diameter is larger than the Sun's, blocking all direct sunlight, turning day into darkness. Totality occurs in a narrow path across Earth's surface, with the partial solar eclipse visible over a surrounding region thousands of kilometres wide.
It began on the morning on February 5 (Friday) over northeastern China (then occupied by Manchukuo), Primorsky Krai in the Soviet Union (now Russia), Hokkaido and southern Kunashir Island in Japan (Kunashir now belonging to Russia) and ended at sunset on February 4 (Thursday) over Alaska and Yukon in Canada.

Related eclipses

Solar eclipses 1942–1946

Saros 120

Metonic series

Notes

References

1943 02 04
1943 in science
1943 02 04
February 1943 events